Samuel Howell (March 11, 1723 – December 9, 1807) was a Quaker who became a prominent merchant in colonial Philadelphia and a leading patriot, proponent, leader and financier for American independence.

When Samuel Howell married Sarah Stretch in 1745, he was a hatter, but became a merchant and importer, and rose to prominence becoming one of the leading and wealthiest merchants of his time. Typical advertisements Samuel Howell placed in the Pennsylvania Gazette show the wide variety of goods and services he offered, examples being on October 24, 1751, page 2 and October 18, 1753, page 3 announcing a large variety of goods, which he had just imported from London, for sale in his shop at the "Sign of the Beaver in Chestnut Street", located at the corner of Chestnut Street and Strawberry Alley.

A Quaker, Samuel was disowned by his meeting on 12 September 1762 for "fitting out his ships in a warlike manner"; his wife was disowned four years later.

"Whereas Samuel Howell of this city merchant, professeth himself convinced of the Christian testimony of Friends against Wars of Fighting, yet persists in fitting out his ships in a warlike manner for which he hath been long treated with in much love and tenderness, and the inconsistency of his conduct laid before him, but as he does not show a proper regard to the advice of friends by discontinuing the practice, and no grounds to expect his compliance therewith, this meeting for the clearing of truth disowns the said Samuel Howell being in religious fellowship with us, until from strict sense of his breach of our testimony he shall seek to be reconciled to friends, and condemns the same to the satisfaction of this meeting, which it is our desire he may be enabled to do, by a more steady attention to the dictates of the peaceable principle of the gospel in his own heart."

He was drawn into the political life of pre-Revolutionary Philadelphia.

In 1765 Samuel Howell "the Merchant" was a signer of the historic Resolution of Non-Importation Made by the Citizens of Philadelphia, October 25, 1765, and one of the prominent merchants selected to solicit other signers and to see that the agreement was put into effect.

He was a member of the local Committee on Correspondence in 1774, Committee of Safety in 1775 and served as a member, 1776-1777. The Committee of Safety was, in fact, a board of war, and had the direction of military affairs in the province. and in 1776 elected to the Pennsylvania Assembly.

He served as chairman of the Philadelphia Committee of Safety and member of the Pennsylvania Council of Safety, discharging executive duties of the state government during the Revolution. Two days after his appointment, the Convention adopted the Declaration of Independence. After the evacuation of Philadelphia by the British he served as a member of the Pennsylvania General Assembly.

Howell gave his family's silver to make the first U. S. currency.

Samuel Howell became a contributor to Pennsylvania Hospital in 1754, was one of its Board of Managers, 1784-9, and President of the Board 1786-9. In 1757 Samuel Howell was a signer of Pennsylvania colonial currency.  Notes totaling £45,000 were authorized March 10, 1757, a total of 72,825 notes, to be signed by any three of twenty-four signers, one of who was Samuel Howell.  In 1788 Howell was one of the port wardens of Philadelphia, and on March 19, 1791, was appointed by President George Washington as a Commissioner of the Bank of the United States.

Howell became a member of the Schuylkill Fishing Company, member No. 133 elected May 1, 1769. His father-in-law's brother, Thomas Stretch, was the founding Governor, member No. 1 elected May 1, 1732; father-in-law Joseph Stretch was member No. 14, elected May 1, 1732, son-in-law Peter Stretch II (1746-1793), member No. 128 elected May 1, 1769; and Samuel Howell's son, Samuel, Jr., member No. 150 elected March 10, 1784.

After the Revolution, when the United States began to trade directly with China, Samuel Howell was an investor in many of the early ventures. In 1788, one of his ships, Sampson, captained by son Samuel Jr., was among the first to sail to China, leaving Philadelphia on November 28, 1788, and returning July 3, 1790. Advertisements in Dunlap's American Daily Advertiser in 1792 announced the sale of nankeens and several varieties of tea that he had imported from China in the ship Sampson. In addition to his residence and store at 54 Chestnut Street in Philadelphia, he owned another lot with stores and a wharf on the east side of Water Street. The Pennsylvania Museum of Art collection of several pieces of China imported by Samuel Howell and his son can be seen here.

He possessed a large landed and personal estate, the latter alone, as shown by the account of his executors, amounting to over $284,000. In today's terms this sum indicates a wealth of $8.1 billion, excluding the value of massive land holdings.

In his Last Will and Testament, Samuel Howell chronicalized three generations of his family, distributing to his surviving children and grandchildren portions of his estate, in many instances with specificity.

In his six-page Will, recorded in Philadelphia Will Book Z, at pp 210–213

12 Dec 1807 - "Samuel Howell of the City and County of Philadelphia . . . bequeaths to my daughter Sarah Stretch widow of Peter Stretch . . ." [pg 210] 
 
". . . bequeaths to the Contributors to the Pennsylvania Hospital . . ." [pg 211] (on whose Board he served, 1784-1789)

". . .grandson Samuel E. Howell and his heirs . . .my mansion and lot situated at the north west corner of Chestnut Street and Strawberry . . ." [pg 212]. This location, also known during colonial times as the "Sign of the Beaver", is where Samuel Howell "the Merchant" began his business selling hats, dry goods and other commodities..  This key detail helps distinguish and clarify Samuel Howell, the Merchant, as the American colonial patriot whose service for the Independence of the United States had its beginning with signing the Non-Importation Agreement.

 . . . to my grandson Joseph E. Howell . . .lot where he now resides, No. 54 Chestnut Street and which I formerly dwelt. . . also wharf and water lot of ground situate on the East side of the water, between High and Chestnut Streets in said City of Philadelphia and in tenure of Jones and Howell Brokers and is bounded by my wharf and lot of ground known by the name of the Crooked Billet Tavern . . .[pg 213]

Family
Samuel Howell, the son of Thomas Howell and Rachel Clayton, was born at Marcus Hook, Chichester, Chester (now Delaware) County, Pennsylvania, March 11, 1723, and died at Tacony, Pennsylvania December 9, 1807. His decease is noted in the Philadelphia Aurora of 14 December 1807: "DIED - at his seat, (Tacony near Frankford) on the ninth instant, in the 85th year of his age, SAMUEL HOWELL, Esq., for many years a Merchant of great respectability in this city."

Samuel Howell and Sarah Stretch were married in the presence of their parents at Friends' Meeting, Philadelphia, on December 12, 1745. Their wedding certificate, a large document which all family members present signed, states: ". . .Samuel Howell of the city of Philadelphia, and province of Pennsylvania, Hatter, son of Thomas Howell of Township Chichester in the County of Chester. . .". The signatures on this document include Samuel Howell's parents: Thomas Howell and Rachel Howell, and Sarah Stretch's parents Joseph and Lydia Stretch.

Samuel's great-grandfather, also named Thomas Howell, emigrated to New Jersey arriving October 28, 1682. Thomas was from Tamworth, Staffordshire, England where he possessed a landed estate. He represented Gloucester County in the West Jersey Assembly in 1683 and 1685, at the time he acquired lands in West Jersey. Thomas died March 9, 1687, at Newton, Gloucester, New Jersey.  His coat of arms, from England, is shown below.

Samuel Howell married Sarah Stretch (1733-1770), daughter of Joseph Stretch (1709-1771) and Lydia Knight, at Friends' Meeting, Philadelphia, on December 12, 1745. Samuel's wife, Sarah, died March 28, 1770, at the age of 37. Her father, Joseph Stretch, was the brother of Thomas Stretch.

Children of Samuel and Sarah Howell:
A. Sarah Howell (1746-1825) married Peter Stretch II (1746-1793), son of Thomas Stretch and Mary Ann Robbins.  She died at Burlington, New Jersey, in April, 1825. Children:
 Elizabeth Stretch
 Joseph H. Stretch, deceased by 1818.
 Mary Howell Stretch (1778-1843), married Theodorus Van Wyck (1776-1840). Theodorus Van Wyck's grandfather was Pierre Van Cortlandt (1721-1814), Lieutenant Governor of New York, 1777-1795. Among their children:
Sarah Howell Van Wyck (1806-1830) married James Budd (1798-1833) of New Jersey.

B. Samuel Howell, Jr. (ca 1748-1802) born in Philadelphia; died 31 October 1802.  He married Margaret Emlen (1750-1822), 23 May 1771. Like his father and kinsmen, he became a member of the State in Schuylkill, March 10, 1784. In 1772 Samuel Howell, Jr. was a signer of Pennsylvania colonial currency.  Notes totaling £25,000 were authorized March 21, 1772, 72,825 notes, to be signed by any one of twenty-four signers, one of who was Samuel Howell, Jr.

C. Elizabeth Howell, married George Douglass at Philadelphia, 8 December 1767. Both deceased prior to 15 February 1808.

D. Joseph Howell, died at Philadelphia, PA, August, 1798. He married Catharine Reynolds.

E. Mary Howell, married Mr. Pascoe, of the Bermudas.

F. Rachel Howell, married Benjamin Thompson on April 29, 1782.

Samuel Howell (1718-1780) 
Misinformation based on an erroneous family genealogy confuses Samuel Howell (1723-1807), "the Merchant", who was a Member of the Committee of Safety and Signer of the 1765 Non-importation Agreement, the son of Thomas Howell and Rachel Clayton, with another Samuel Howell (1718-1780), son of Jacob Howell and Sarah Vernon. As demonstrated in documents cites above, including his Last Will and Testament, it is Samuel Howell the Merchant whose business was based at the Sign of the Beaver, located at the corner of Chestnut Street and Strawberry, which was among the properties he bequeathed at the time of his death in 1807. Among the source documents and research confirming this are birth records, will and probate records and other sources cited above. Samuel Howell (1718-1780) died eleven years before President Washington bestowed a Commission to Samuel Howell, the financier and merchant, as a Commissioner of the United States Bank.

The confusion arises from Jonathan Howell's unsourced family genealogy conflating these two Samuel Howells. Sadly, this error has been relied upon by some without further study. by the Historical Society of Pennsylvania - Philadelphia's Library of American History 

As demonstrated by his Last Will and Testament, Samuel Howell "the Merchant" and his family continued to own and occupy his property at "The Sign of the Beaver", corner of Chestnut and Strawberry, which he bequeathed in 1807 to a grandson.

12 Dec 1807 - "Samuel Howell of the City and County of Philadelphia . . . bequeaths to my daughter Sarah Stretch widow of Peter Stretch . . ." [pg 210] 
 
". . . bequeaths to the Contributors to the Pennsylvania Hospital . . ." [pg 211] (on whose Board he served, 1784-1789)

". . .grandson Samuel E. Howell and his heirs . . .my mansion and lot situated at the north west corner of Chestnut Street and Strawberry . . ." [pg 212]. This location, also known during colonial times as the "Sign of the Beaver", where Howell began his business selling hats, dry goods and other commodities..  This key detail helps distinguish and clarify Samuel Howell, the Merchant, as the American colonial patriot whose service for the Independence of the United States had its beginning with signing the Non-Importation Agreement.

 . . . to my grandson Joseph E. Howell . . .lot where he now resides, No. 54 Chestnut Street and which I formerly dwelt. . . also wharf and water lot of ground situate on the East side of the water, between High and Chestnut Streets in said City of Philadelphia and in tenure of Jones and Howell Brokers and is bounded by my wharf and lot of ground known by the name of the Crooked Billet Tavern . . .[pg 213]

Life in Colonial Philadelphia
Samuel Howell was instructed in that of hatter, but early in life abandoned this calling to engage in mercantile pursuits. He removed to Philadelphia, where he established himself as an importer and merchant, and rose to prominence, becoming one of the leading and wealthiest merchants of his time.

Howell opened a mercantile business located at Strawberry Alley and Chestnut Street, Philadelphia, at the "Sign of the Beaver" involved in importing goods, providing transportation to Europe by sea and other activities. An idea of the extent and variety of merchandise imported and sold by Howell for decades between the 1740s and early 1800s can be seen in his advertisements, such as one in the Pennsylvania Gazette, printed by Benjamin Franklin October 11, 1753 (at left) and another on October 18, 1753, transcribed below:

By the mid 18th-century, Howell was diversifying his business and investing in real estate. In addition to vast swaths of farm land and commercial buildings, he acquired the famous Crooked Billet Tavern and Inn, and surrounding land, which demonstrate the extent to which he expanded.

In Philadelphia's early years there were no separate buildings which served as dance halls, theaters, or clubs — taverns, instead, provided all-purpose service. Until the Revolutionary War era, taverns and inns were the largest public buildings in Philadelphia.  Drinking establishments in Colonial Philadelphia, be they in the form of coffee houses, taverns, or unlicensed "tippling houses", were more than places to drink and dine. Taverns were where the community conducted business, got its news, argued politics, attended concerts and auctions, socialized, or just plain got polluted.

Between Market and Chestnut Streets the embankment staircase of the Crooked Billet Steps rose from the Crooked Billet Wharf to the Tavern. The Crooked Billet public landing, located at the foot of Chestnut Street, was a bustling wharf where sailing ships docked to off-load their goods and passengers, and took on -board passengers bound for Europe.  Regular water taxis sailed from Philadelphia to the New Jersey shore.  This pier extended from Water Street onto the Delaware River roughly one hundred feet north of the bottom of Chestnut Street. The original wharf, warehouses and an inn were built by Alice Guest c 1690. The Crooked Billet Tavern and Inn is where, in 1723, Benjamin Franklin had his first hot meal and spent his first night in Philadelphia. At one time, it was the tavern of longest uninterrupted operation in the city.

The Crooked Billet Tavern was located on the site of the present 35 South Front Street, not quite one hundred and fifty feet north of Chestnut Street, and had a frontage of twenty-four feet on both Front and Water streets. Since the tavern had been accommodating strangers as early as 1690, it was reputed to be one of the oldest taverns in town.

Pennsylvania was the overwhelming choice of German immigrants during the middle half of the eighteenth century and Samuel Howell was active in transporting these immigrants. Between 1727 and 1775 there were 317 German immigrant voyages employing 190 different captains. Quite a diverse group of large and small, Philadelphia and non-Philadelphia merchants, were engaged in shipping German immigrants to Philadelphia. When the ships docked at Philadelphia the redemptioner servants were consigned to local merchants who collected the amounts due from their sale. Prepaying passengers did not have to be consigned.

A few merchants specialized in the trade. As a group Stedman, Shoemaker, Willing & Morris, Samuel Howell, and Daniel Beneset gained around 60 percent of the consignments. Between 1763-1774 Howell had twelve ships carrying a total of 810 adult male immigrants.

Proponent, leader and financier of the American Revolution
Early on, Howell manifested sympathy for the colonies in their opposition to the exactions and oppressions of the English government, and when the attempt was made to enforce the Stamp Act in Pennsylvania he aligned with those determined to resist its demands.

On October 25, 1765, the merchants and traders of Philadelphia subscribed to the historic Resolution of Non-Importation Made by the Citizens of Philadelphia, which he signed, and was one of the prominent merchants selected as a committee to solicit other signers and to see that the agreement was put into effect, consisting of Thomas Willing, Samuel Mifflin, Thomas Montgomery, Samuel Howell, Samuel Wharton, John Rhea, William Fisher, Joshua Fisher, Peter Chevalier, Benjamin Fuller and Abel James.  This level of resistance activity exhausted the patriotism of many merchants, particularly those of the Quaker faith, but not that of Samuel Howell, who, when more heroic measures became necessary, was found among the foremost of those who planned to oppose and defeat the will of the Crown. Howell was also part of the committee responsible for enforcing the Resolution.  Undoubtedly the decision was made at the expense of his business because, as can be understood reading his advertisements, once he signed the Non-Importation Resolution he lost access to many of the manufactured goods from England that would have been sold in his shop.  The boycott proved to be successful, and British Parliament repealed the Stamp Act in 1766.

Howell was chosen a member of the Committee on Correspondence, composed of forty-three leading citizens.  Steps were immediately taken by this body for a convention (or conference, as it was called), to be composed of delegates elected in the several counties of the Province.  Howell was elected from Philadelphia, and participated in the convention which met at Carpenters' Hall 15 July 1774, with Thomas Willing as chairman.

By the vote of the convention, the delegates from Philadelphia were constituted a Committee on Correspondence for the province, and Howell remained a member of this important body until 3 July 1775, when it was succeeded by a Council of Safety, of which Benjamin Franklin was the chairman. Howell was active in the business of the Council, which was that of raising, arming, and equipping troops, creating a navy, building fortifications, procuring the munitions of war, etc.

Samuel Howell not only voted for such measures, but he served on special committees in furtherance of these ends. The level of his activity is seen in the Minutes of the meeting on November 7, 1775, some of which services are outlined in the following extracts from the proceedings of the council:

Howell continued a member of the Council until 22 July 1776.  He was then re-elected, but declined the honor. During the same year he was elected to the assembly, receiving the highest vote in the poll.

Meeting of Citizens in Philadelphia - November 2, 1775
A transcription of the broadside issued stated:

Contemplating the evacuation of Philadelphia by the British, George Washington, in correspondence to Henry Laurens, President of the Continental Congress, from Valley Forge, June 1, 1778, wrote:

Financier
Samuel Howell, sensing problems at the outset of the Revolutionary War, adroitly conveying his property for safekeeping to Hope & Company, the Amsterdam banking house of Henry Hope, the richest man in Europe at the time. Baring Brothers, the English merchant banking house, acted as agent for Hope & Company after the war purchasing large amounts of American land and discounted securities.

When the British occupied Philadelphia early in the war, Howell was taken prisoner even though he was a Quaker.

Important Revolutionary War financial instruments made to Samuel Howell and some signed by him include Continental Bills of Exchange used to pay interest on the United States debt in French Francs loaned to the fledgling United States by Louis XVI for that express purpose.

In 1781, as a Director of the Bank of North America, Howell was called upon to save the country's finances. The Bank, issued a charter by the Continental Congress and the State of Pennsylvania, made loans from its capital and supplied the need for a circulating medium by issuing notes on the credit of its stock.

After the Revolutionary War, his property still safe in the hands of Hope & Company, and armed with letters of credit from Hope, some men seemed jealous that Howell was thought to have more money than he really had.  When the first bank in this country, the Bank of North America (est. 1782) refused to discount some prominent Philadelphian's notes, a group of those excluded tried to start a new bank to compete with the exclusive Bank of North America in 1784-5.

In a letter to Alexander Hamilton dated January 17, 1784, Gouverneur Morris explained:

Howell transferred his Property to the House of Hopes (House of Hope, a Dutch banking house founded by Henry Hope) in Amsterdam at the beginning of the American Revolution. With them it remained during the War and in return, several Dutch men have brought him Letters of Recommendation from that House. This circumstance has raised the Idea that he possesses great Credit abroad, which Credit will, it is supposed give Stability to the Bank. Be this as it may, he is said to be an honest Man, which is no bad thing in any Case.

On March 19, 1791, Howell was appointed by President Washington a commissioner of the First Bank of the United States.

Transcription:

Alexander Hamilton arranging for the commissions to be signed by President Washington:

Howell was one of three commissioners chosen by George Washington for the taking of subscriptions for this new bank. Nothing came of this first freedom of competition movement when a compromise solution was reached between the two rival banking groups and those originally denied banking privileges were allowed to buy into the Bank of North America at the same price as the original stockholders ($400/share), a considerable sum for that era.

References

1723 births
1807 deaths
Quakers from Pennsylvania
Colonial American merchants
People of colonial Pennsylvania
Patriots in the American Revolution
Financiers of the American Revolution
People from Upper Chichester Township, Pennsylvania
People of Pennsylvania in the American Revolution